Classifications of Charcot–Marie–Tooth disease refers to the types and subtypes of Charcot–Marie–Tooth disease (CMT), a genetically and clinically heterogeneous group of inherited disorders of the peripheral nervous system characterized by progressive loss of muscle tissue and touch sensation across various parts of the body.  CMT is a result of genetic mutations in a number of genes.


Clinical categories

Genetic subtypes 

It has to be kept in mind that sometimes a particular patient diagnosed with CMT can exhibit a combination of any of the above gene mutations; thus, in these cases precise classification can be arbitrary.

References

Peripheral nervous system disorders